Wizard of the Hood is the debut EP by Violent J. Released in 2003, it is the Insane Clown Posse member's first solo release. The EP is a concept album based on The Wizard of Oz, which is retold in an urban setting. Several tracks from the EP also sample music from the 1978 film The Wiz, another urban reimagining of The Wizard of Oz. A song with the same title had previously been released on the album Carnival of Carnage.

Plot
Violent J takes on the role of this story's version of Dorothy, making his way through this strange new land to get back to his home. Along the way, he meets the Scarecrow (Twiztid's Monoxide), who only needs somebody to smoke with, the Tin Man (Twiztid's Jamie Madrox), who wants a "gat", and the Lion (Blaze Ya Dead Homie), who wants some "hoes". Anybody Killa has a brief cameo as a guard in the Wizard's palace as well as fellow Insane Clown Posse member Shaggy 2 Dope appears as the Wizard.

Release
The EP contains nine story tracks and two "bonus tracks". It was also released in a "Collector's Edition" tin which featured two different bonus tracks and a package of "Violent Joint" rolling paper. In an early 2014 interview Violent J said that he would like to do a Wizard Of The Hood show. During ICP's 2014 GOTJ seminar he said that it may happen very soon. On July 24, 2015 during ICP's seminar Violent J said that he would like to do a Wizard of the Hood full album set at the 2016 GOTJ if Twiztid and Blaze Ya Dead Homie are down to do it also. Violent J announced in October, 2015 that they will be performing the whole Wizard of the Hood setlist for GOTJ 17 (2016) complete with changing sets and Twiztid and Blaze Ya Dead Homie will be on stage to do their parts.

Track listing

Cast
Violent J — Violent J
Monoxide — Scarecrow 
Madrox — Tin Tizzy
Blaze Ya Dead Homie — The Lion
Anybody Killa — Palace Guard
Shaggy 2 Dope — The Wizard

Chart positions

References

2003 EPs
Concept albums
Violent J albums
Psychopathic Records EPs